Fantasia Among the Squares is a 1971 French film.  It was directed by Gérard Pirès and stars Lino Ventura, Jean Yanne and Mireille Darc. Alain Delon has a cameo.

The French title was Fantasia chez les ploucs.

It was based on a novel by Charles Williams and was set in Alabama, USA.

References

External links

French comedy films
1971 films
1970s French-language films
Films based on American novels
Films set in Alabama
1970s French films
Foreign films set in the United States